Rey is a surname. Notable people with the surname include:

Abel Rey, French philosopher and historian of science.
Alain Rey, French linguist, lexicographer and radio personality
Alain Rey (ski mountaineer), Swiss ski mountaineer
Alejandro Rey, Argentine actor
Alexandre Rey (born 1972), Swiss former footballer 
Alvino Rey, American musician
Ana del Rey, Spanish actor
André Rey (footballer), French footballer
André Rey (psychologist), Swiss psychologist
Anthony Rey, French Jesuit
Barret Rey, American college baseball coach
Dominique Rey, French clergy, bishop of Fréjus-Toulon
Émile Rey (1846-1895), alpine mountain guide
Eugene Rey (1838–1909), German chemist and ornithologist
Fernando Rey, the stage name of Spanish-born actor Fernando Casado D'Arambillet
Gabriel Venance Rey, French general of the French Revolution and Napoleonic Wars
Hans Rey, German cyclist
H. A. Rey and Margret Rey, authors of the Curious George series of children's books
Jacques Rey (born 1942), French politician
Jean-Baptiste Rey (1734-1810), French conductor and composer
Jean Rey (physician), French physician and chemist
Jean Rey (politician), Belgian Liberal politician, former president of the European Commission
Jean-Yves Rey, Swiss ski mountaineer
José Manuel Rey, Venezuelan football player
Julio Rey, Spanish marathon runner
Lana Del Rey, American singer, songwriter, record producer, and model
Louis-Charles-Joseph Rey (1738–1811), cellist and composer
Louis Emmanuel Rey, French general of the French Revolution and Napoleonic Wars
Luis Rey, Spanish-Mexican artist and Led Zeppelin expert
Nicholas Andrew Rey, United States ambassador
Micheline Calmy-Rey, Swiss politician
Ofelia Rey Castelao, Spanish historian, writer, and university professor
Paola Rey, Colombian actress
Reynaldo Rey, American actor and comedian 
Robert Rey, plastic surgeon and subject of Dr. 90210 reality television show
Tony Rey (musician), American guitarist
Willy Rey, Playboy Playmate of the Month, February 1971

Fictional characters
Samandahl Rey, comic book character

See also
Rey (disambiguation)
Rey (given name)
Rei (name)